Wierzba  was a settlement in the administrative district of Gmina Nowa Brzeźnica, within Pajęczno County, Łódź Voivodeship, in central Poland.

History
It was burned when Hitler invaded with his army of Nazi soldiers.

References

Villages in Pajęczno County